Fabienne Dali (born Marie-Louise De Vos; 22 September 1941) is a Belgian actress. She appeared in more than fifteen films from 1960 to 1969.

Selected filmography

References

External links 

1941 births
Living people
Belgian film actresses